Final Encounter may refer to:

 For the Cause (film), also known as Final Encounter, a 2000 science-fiction fantasy film
 Final Encounter (album), a 1989 album by Leslie Cheung

See also